Farmdrop was an online grocer with a focus on food sourced from local farmers, fishermen, and other producers. The company provided farm-to-table foods for consumers in Greater London and surrounding counties, along with ethically-sourced baby & kids, household, pets, and deli products. They informed customers on 17 December 2021 that they had collapsed following a failure to secure additional funding.

Ben Pugh, a former stockbroker for Morgan Stanley, founded the company in 2012, which was based in London, England. In December 2015, the company had 20 employees, and in April 2016 worked with around 80 food producers. As of April 2018, it was working with 450 producers. Farmdrop had a mobile app that consumers used to interface with the company.

History
The earliest work in forming Farmdrop began with Pugh meeting local farmers at their farms to acquire prospective producers to work with the company. Various foods including organic foods could be ordered online and delivered. Farmers and fishermen received a higher percentage of the retail price using Farmdrop because no middlemen were involved in the supply chain. In March 2017, the company had around 30,000 active users.

The company was formally founded by Pugh in 2012 using around £750,000 in funding from other sources. In 2016, the company received £3 million in funding. In April 2017, the company received another £7 million. In June 2018, the company raised another £10 million.

In late 2018, Farmdrop upgraded its brand identity with a new logo and positioning, coinciding with the addition of new product lines such as sourced household goods, wine and drinks, as well as baby & kid's items. It was realized in collaboration with design studio Confederation Studio following co-creation principles.

in March 2019, an ad from the company featuring a mix of fresh produce, bacon, eggs and butter, was rejected by TfL (Transport for London, which operates the London Underground) due to its updated regulation on HFSS (high in fat, sugar and salt) foods and how they are advertised in the London Underground. A debate ensued, with Farmdrop raising questions around the scoring system used to determine what is healthy food. The company declared it fully supported "preventing brands from aggressively advertising junk food to children".

In March/April 2019, Farmdrop launched an initiative to review and reduce plastic packaging in its fresh produce. It shared the findings and results, including using plant-based compostable bags for broccoli, kale, salad and bread.

In December 2021, the company collapsed due to the inability to secure sufficient capital to continue operating.

Education campaign
In September 2016, Farmdrop began providing its "Farmology" education campaign, which provided information to consumers about the origins of foods. The Farmology campaign corresponded with the start of the school year in England.

See also

 List of online grocers
 List of companies based in London
 Local food

Notes

References

Food retailers of the United Kingdom
Online grocers
Companies based in the London Borough of Islington
Retail companies established in 2012
2012 establishments in the United Kingdom
Online retailers of the United Kingdom